The  Catalan Sheepdog (French: Berger Catalan) is a breed of Catalan Pyrenean dog used as a sheepdog. This dog is bred in Europe, especially in Spain, Finland, Germany, and Sweden.

Appearance

Catalan sheepdogs range in size from 17 to 19 in (45 to 55 cm) in height and 45 to 60 lb (20 to 27 kg) in weight for males, with females being smaller. Their coat is long and either flat or slightly wavy, and ranges from fawn to dark sable and light to dark grey. There is also a short-haired variety of this breed, but it is nearly extinct.

Size and weight 

Height at withers: 47−55 cm and 20−25 kg for male dogs; from 45−53 cm and 17–21 kg for females.

Hair and hair color 

Long and limp and a little curled.
Seen from afar the dog seems to be unicolour and may have lighter shadings at the limbs. When seen close up, it is noticeable that the colour comes from a mixture of hairs of different colour shades: fawn, brown more or less reddish, grey and black.
Long, flat, or very slightly wavy, rough with abundant undercoat on the whole posterior third of the body. On the head a beard, moustaches, tuft and eyebrows which do not affect sight can be noticed. Tail well covered with hair as are all four limbs. It is noticeable that during moulting a typical phenomenon may be observed: it occurs in two periods. First of all it affects the coat on the front part, giving the impression of two halves with different coats; then moults the hind part of the dog and everything becomes uniform again.

Temperament

This breed is used for herding and as a pet dog. Because of its intelligence, the Gos D'Atura, like most sheepdogs, is easy to train. This cheerful dog excels at dog-sports, such as agility and doggy-dance. In spite of its appearance, this courageous dog is also used as a watch-dog. An "all-around-dog" and great companion.

They guard sheep without needing instruction. Enough (outdoor) activity and distraction makes this dog a quiet and well-balanced home companion.  This breed is appropriate for people with firm techniques and who can give the dog enough exercise. Early socialization is important, particularly if the dog will be around children. The dogs defend their family and become attached to it.

Activities
The Gos d'Atura can compete in dog agility trials, obedience, showmanship, flyball, tracking, and herding events. Herding instincts and trainability can be measured at noncompetitive herding tests. Catalan sheepdogs exhibiting basic herding instincts can be trained to compete in herding trials.

Health
Catalan sheepdogs are prone to hip dysplasia. Their average life span is 12 to 14 years.

In popular culture 
 Cobi, the official mascot of the 1992 Summer Olympics in Barcelona, is a Catalan sheepdog.
 Einstein in Back to the Future trilogy, is a Catalan sheepdog.
 Greavard, a ghost-type Pokémon introduced in Pokémon Scarlet and Violet, is based on this dog breed.

See also
 Dogs portal
 List of dog breeds

References

External links

FCI breeds
Herding dogs
Dog breeds originating in Catalonia